"D-O-G Me Out" is a song by the American R&B group Guy recorded for their second studio album The Future (1990). It was released in August 1991, the fourth single from the album.

Track listings
12", Vinyl
"D-O-G Me Out" (Canine Club Version) – 6:27
"D-O-G Me Out" (Dogapella) – 6:22
"D-O-G Me Out" (Mike Nice Mix) – 5:40
"D-O-G Me Out" (Mike Nice Dub Mix) – 5:37

CD, Maxi
"D-O-G Me Out" (Single Edit)
"D-O-G Me Out" (Single Edit w/ Rap)
"D-O-G Me Out" (Canine Club Version)
"D-O-G Me Out" (Wrecks N Effect Rap)
"D-O-G Me Out" (Dogapella)
"D-O-G Me Out" (Wrecks N Effectstrumental)
"D-O-G Me Out" (Mike Nice Dub Mix)

Chart performance

Notes

External links

1991 singles
Guy (band) songs
Song recordings produced by Teddy Riley
Songs written by Teddy Riley
1990 songs
MCA Records singles
Songs written by Aaron Hall (singer)